Ectoedemia zimbabwiensis is a moth of the family Nepticulidae. It was described by Scoble in 1983. It is known from Zimbabwe.

References

Nepticulidae
Moths of Africa
Moths described in 1983
Taxa named by Malcolm Scoble